The Z platform or Z-body automobile platform designation was used on three different types of vehicles made by General Motors.

Chevrolet Corvair

The first was both generations of the Chevrolet Corvair from 1960 to 1969, which were a rear-wheel-drive and rear-engine compact car.
 The Corvair featured a rear-mounted six-cylinder Chevrolet Turbo-Air 6 engine that included many aluminum components and an aluminum block, along with a rear swing-axle (up to 1964) suspension and rear transaxle. From 1965 the rear suspension was similar to the then current Corvette except that coils were used in place of a transverse leaf. 

Vehicles using the rear-drive/rear-engine Z-body include:
 1960–1969 Chevrolet Corvair 500
 1960–1969 Chevrolet Corvair Monza
 1965–1966 Chevrolet Corvair Corsa

Chevrolet Corvette

After the Corvair was discontinued the Corvette utilized the platform from 1972 until 1975 when the "Y platform" was repurposed for the Corvette. The second digit in the VIN number displays vehicles that used this platform followed by either Body Style 37 for coupe or 67 for convertible.

Vehicles using the front-engine/rear-drive Z-body include:
 1972–1975 Chevrolet Corvette Stingray Sport Coupe
 1972–1975 Chevrolet Corvette Stingray convertible

Saturn S-Series

The third was Saturn's automobile platform from its debut in 1990 until 2002, which were front-wheel drive compact cars. This platform was replaced with the GM Delta platform.

Vehicles using the front-drive/front-engine Z-body include:
 1991–2002 Saturn SC
 1991–2002 Saturn SL
 1993–2001 Saturn SW

External links

Z-body

Z